Hesione, in Greek mythology, is the daughter of Laomedon, and the sister of Priam, rescued from a sea-monster by the hero Heracles.

Hesione may also refer to:
 Other figures in Greek mythology:
 Hesione (Oceanid), in Greek mythology, a daughter of the Titan Oceanus
 Hesione, one of the names given for the wife of Nauplius, according to Cercops, as cited by the mythographer Apollodorus (2.1.5).
 Hesione, daughter of Celeus and one of the sacrificial victims of Minotaur
 Hésione, an opera by the French composer André Campra
 SS Hesione, the name of several steamships
 Hesione, a character in George Bernard Shaw's Heartbreak House